Vienna Conference can refer to:

Vienna Conference (1819), held in 1819 and 1820. 
Vienna Conference (1853),
Vienna Conference (1855),
Vienna Socialist Conference of 1915
Vienna Conference (1961), resulted in the Vienna Convention on Diplomatic Relations and the Vienna Convention on Consular Relations
Vienna Conference (1969), resulted in the Vienna Convention on the Law of Treaties
Vienna Conference on Science and Technology for Development, 1979 see Commission on Science and Technology for Development
Vienna Conference (1985), was the first international conference on ozone layer depletion.
Vienna Conference (1993), also known as the World Conference on Human Rights, resulted in the Vienna Declaration and Programme of Action
Vienna Conference on Instrumentation, held in 2007
Vienna Conference on Cluster Munitions, held 5 to 7 December 2007

See also
Congress of Vienna (disambiguation)
Treaty of Vienna (disambiguation) 
Vienna Convention (disambiguation)